Palari is a type of Indonesian sailing vessel from South Sulawesi. It was mainly used by the people of Ara and Lemo Lemo, for transporting goods and people. This vessel is rigged with pinisi rig, which often makes it better known as "Pinisi" instead of its name. In Singapore, palari is known as "Makassar trader".

Etymology 
The name of this boat comes from Bugis word lari meaning "to run" or "running". The word pa is a suffix used in forming nouns designating persons from the object of their occupation or labor, equivalent to English -or/-er, so the meaning of palari would be "runner". This refers to the fact that this vessel is nimbler and faster than its predecessor, the padewakang.

Description 

Palari is about 50–70 feet (15.24–21.34 m) in length overall, with light laden waterline of 34–43 feet (10.36–13.1 m). The sails are built using light canvas, while the topsails are linen cloth. The crew is about 7–8 men. It is steered using double quarter rudders. Under favorable conditions, they may reach 9–10 knots (16.7–18.5 km/h) in speed. A vessel with 30 ft waterline could carry nearly 400 pikul (22.7–25 tons).

In 1920–1930's palari, the crew sleep in narrow shelf hung by rope under the deck. Traditionally, the captain owns a small stern cabin 2 m in length and 1 m in height, under the deck planking. Certain passengers own temporary cabins built on the deck. Cooking is done in clay cooking hearth in a movable hearth about 1–2 m high. They sometimes had a woman aboard as the cook, occasionally she's the wife of the captain. The toilet is located at the back, hanging atop the stern. Water is stored in jerrycans, drums, and pots and the crew lives primarily by rice.

The palari hull is built from type of hull from Sulawesi, namely the pajala. Pajala is an undecked coasting boat which usually has a tripod mast carrying a single large tanja sail. It is carvel-built, and like other malay boat, it is a double ender (the bow and stern of the boat is sharp i.e having stem and sternpost). Palari hull, is built by adding more planks upwards the pajala hull about 2–3 feet (61–91 cm), adding an overhanging stern deck (called ambeng in Malay language), plus the construction of decking.

History

Pajala to palari hull 
In the 18th century, Bugis people sailed a type of perahu similar with patorani. The hull is from pajala type, the rig is using a canted triangular sail in a tripod mast, with weight less than 50 tons. Many of them can bee seen in Australian beach collecting teripang between 1800–1840. In 1880, a boat dubbed "Bugis prahu" seems to have been the prototype of palari hull. It was a midway development to palari, with western-styled deck but with traditional (indigenous) stern (the ambeng stern). A bowsprit and jibsail has been added, but it's still using a tanja sail on a single tripod mast. There was no cabin at the stern.

Pajala hull then undergoes modification, by adding additional planking thus making the hull higher and increasing cargo capacity. A "step" is made at the bow and "overhanging stern deck" (ambeng) also added.

From padewakang-tanja to palari-pinisi 
The first Sulawesian "true" pinisi (i.e the palari hull using pinisi rig) was thought to has been first built in 1906 by the shipuilders of Ara and Lemo-Lemo, they built the first penisiq [sic] for a Bira skipper. A one masted variant is called palari jengki (they are also called one-masted pinisi). The one masted boats have a much simpler sail plan. They are rigged with nade sail (gunter rig), occasionally with loose-footed cutter rig (without pekaki, or lower spar).

What pushed Sulawesi sailors to abandon the sombala tanja that has been used from the past for pinisi rig which is more European in nature according to Haji Daeng Pale is the ease of its usage. When the wind rises, the person on the boat using the sails has to roll the big sail onto the boom below, a heavy and dangerous job. The pinisi sail can be reduced section by section starting with closing the topsail and the headsail. If the wind increases again, it is rather easy to reduce the large sail by pulling it towards the mast, so that the boat using the sail is closed halfway and one or more of the headsails is still functioning sufficiently and the steering power is not lost. Besides this, there is also a difference in sailing ability, the pinisi sail can sail closer to the wind. The most important thing is that the boat can turn around more easily when beating to windward.

The fleet of palari-pinisi at the end of the 1930s became the archipelago's greatest trading fleet, competing with Madurese leti-leti, plied as far as Singapore to trade. But this changed when the World War II broke out. During the war, it was not profitable for them to sail further west than Surabaya and Semarang. Salemo island is a small trading centre that has been a home to about 100 trading pinisi. A villager from the island said that at the east shore of the island (which is about 650 m long):
"The pinisi would form an uninterrupted line, as they anchor side by side, along the shore. One may go on board a pinisi from one end; walk over the decks of the vessels and get off at the other end; so that one may move from the south to the north of the island without stepping on the soil between"

During World War II the Japanese forced Biran pinisi to load the necessities of modern warfare and many were sunk by Allied planes and warships. The situation is the same on Salemo island, just before the Indonesian independence day, Salemo island was targeted by Allies' air strike. Many of the pinisi were apprehended or bombed at sea. Surviving pinisi owner fled to Jakarta and Surabaya. After World War II during Indonesian national revolution, many Biran vessels were engaged in smuggling weapons from Singapore to Java for the new Indonesian National Army. When peace was restored, sailing ships were the only means of transport which could function without expensive spare parts which had to be imported from abroad and Biran trading revived rapidly. Because of the economy situation, new merchants could only afford to build lambo, smaller in size than the pinisi. Nevertheless, while before the war the biggest ships could load only about 40 tons, in the 1950s Biran sailors started to order ships of 100 tons and more and from 1960 on increasingly transported consigned cargoes owned by Chinese and Indonesian traders instead of bartering with commodities in East Indonesia. In 1960–1970 palari-pinisi became the world largest sailboat trading fleet, numbering 800–1000 units, still competing with leti-leti, which has about the same number. Starting from 1970s motorization of traditional vessels started, and it will be revealed that the traditional palari hull couldn't accommodate engine effectively unlike the lambo's hull. A new ship, the lambo-pinisi, took over the role of palari-pinisi, and then evolve to PLM (Perahu Layar Motor — motorized sailboat), which can load up to 300 ton.

See also 
 Padewakang
 Patorani
 Lis alis
 Janggolan

References

Further reading 

Horridge, Adrian (2015). Perahu Layar Tradisional Nusantara. Yogyakarta: Penerbit Ombak. An Indonesian translation of Horridge, Adrian (1985). The Prahu: Traditional Sailing Boat of Indonesia, second edition. Oxford: Oxford University Press.

External links
 Traditional Boats by Horst Liebner 
 Biran Sailing 

Ship types
Indonesian inventions
Boats of Indonesia
Indigenous boats
Sailing ships
Sailboat types
Merchant ships
Tall ships